Minasteron is a genus of spiders in the family Zodariidae. It was first described in 2000 by Baehr & Jocqué. , it contains 3 Australian species.

References

Zodariidae
Araneomorphae genera
Spiders of Australia